is the name of a range of mountains in southeastern Hyōgo Prefecture, Japan.

Outline 

There is no single mountain or peak called "Rokkō," although the highest peak of the mountains is called , (literally, the highest peak of the Rokkō Mountains) and the area to the south is known as the Rokkō area. It also includes Mount Maya, Mount Kabutoyama, Mount Iwahara and Mount Iwakura.

Today, the Rokkō mountain area is a centerpiece of a popular sightseeing and hiking area for people in the metropolitan Kansai region. Mt. Rokkō is a symbol of Kobe as well as Osaka.

History 
Arthur Hasketh Groom opened the first golf course in Japan, Kobe Golf Club, on Mt. Rokko in 1903.

Mount Rokkō was the first place to introduce rock climbing to the Japanese by Kuzou Fujiki who established the first rock climbing club in Japan in 1924.

Points of interest
 Rokkō Alpine Botanical Garden
 Nunobiki Herb Garden
 Nunobiki Falls
 
 Rokkosan Pasture
 Kobe Golf Club
 Ashiya Country Club
 Okuike
 East Rokko Observatory/Route Cafe

Trivia 
For many years, lenses made by the Minolta Camera Company were designated as "Rokkor", named after the mountains near Osaka, where the company was headquartered.

The theme song of the Baseball Team Hanshin Tigers is named Rokko Oroshi (六甲おろし) and themed after Mt. Rokko.

Access 
 Rokkō Sanjō Station of Rokkō Cable Line
 Kinenhidai Bus Stop of Hankyu Bus
 Hoshi no Eki Station of Maya Cable

Gallery

See also 

 Hōrai Valley
 Kamakura Valley
 Rokkō oroshi - gale blowing down from Mt. Rokkō
 Rokkō oroshi (song)
 Rokkō Island - artificial island south of Kobe
 Listed in The 100 Views of Nature in Kansai

References

External links
 Japan-guide.com Mount Rokkō
 Rokkosan Guide House Mount Rokkō

Rokko
Geography of Kobe
Tourist attractions in Kobe
Shugendō